Humberto Galea (born 23 July 1950) is a Venezuelan sprinter. He competed in the men's 4 × 100 metres relay at the 1972 Summer Olympics.

References

External links
 

1950 births
Living people
Athletes (track and field) at the 1972 Summer Olympics
Venezuelan male sprinters
Olympic athletes of Venezuela
Place of birth missing (living people)
20th-century Venezuelan people
21st-century Venezuelan people